Angilan may refer to:
 Angelan, Azerbaijan
 Angilan, a barangay in Antequera, Bohol, Philippines
 Angilan, a barangay in Duero, Bohol, Philippines
 Angilan, a barangay in Aloguinsan, Cebu, Philippines
 Angilan, a barangay in Omar, Sulu, Philippines